The 2020 Incarnate Word Cardinals football team represented the University of the Incarnate Word (UIW) in the 2020–21 NCAA Division I FCS football season as a member of the Southland Conference. The Cardinals played their home games at Gayle and Tom Benson Stadium in San Antonio, Texas. They were led by third-year head coach Eric Morris.  On August 13 Incarnate Word announced they would postpone all competition for the Fall 2020 and instead opted for a Spring 2021 season.

Previous season
The Cardinals finished the 2019 season 5–7, 4–5 in Southland play to finish in a tie for sixth place.

Preseason

Preseason poll
The Southland Conference released their spring preseason poll in January 2021. The Cardinals were picked to finish fifth in the conference. In addition, two Cardinals were chosen to the Preseason All-Southland Team

Preseason All–Southland Teams

Defense

2nd Team
Kelechi Anyalabechi – Linebacker, JR
Jaylon Jimmerson – Defensive Back, SO

Schedule
Source:

Personnel

Coaching staff
Source:

Roster
Source:

Depth chart

Postseason honors
The following Cardinals received postseason honors for the 2020 season:

STATS Perform FCS Jerry Rice Award
QB  Cameron Ward – Freshman

Southland Conference Freshman of the Year
QB  Cameron Ward

All–Southland Conference Spring Football First–Team
RB  Kevin Brown – Senior
LB  Kelechi Anyalebechi – Junior
KR  Ce'Cori Tolds – Junior

All–Southland Conference Spring Football Second–Team
WR  Robert Ferrel – Junior
OL  Caleb Johnson – Junior
DL  Cameron Preston – Junior
DB  Shawn Holton – Sophomore
PR  Robert Ferrel – Junior

All–Southland Conference Spring Football Third–Team
QB  Cameron Ward – Freshman
OL  Nash Jones – Freshman
OL  Reid Francis – Freshman
K   Carson Mohr – Sophomore
DL  Blaine Hoover – Junior
DL  Chance Main – Junior
LB  Isaiah Paul – Freshman
DB  Elliott Davison – Freshman

Game summaries

@ McNeese State

@ Lamar

Southeastern Louisiana

@ Nicholls

@ Northwestern State

Sam Houston State

References

Incarnate Word
Incarnate Word Cardinals football seasons
Incarnate Word Cardinals football